The Patalpani Waterfall is a waterfall on the Choral River, a tributary of the Narmada, located in the Mhow Tehsil of Indore district in the state of  Madhya Pradesh, India.

The falls
Patalpani is a waterfall in Madhya Pradesh. It has an approximate 91 metres (300 ft). It is on the Choral River. 

The water flow is highest immediately after the rainy season (usually after July). It goes almost dry in the summer season, and the stream is reduced to a trickle. The area around Patalpani is a popular picnic and trekking spot.

Etymology 

According to folklore, the pit (kund) at the bottom of the falls goes as deep as patal (the underworld in Indian mythology). Therefore, the falls are called Patal-pani, pani being the Hindi word for water.

Location
The nearest airport is Indore International Airport which is situated at a distance of roughly 40 KM from the falls. The rest of the distance has to be covered via road or rail transport means.  Dr. Ambedkar Nagar (MHOW) is the nearest town.

Rail
The nearest railway station is Patalpani railway station near the falls at a distance of 200 m  on the Dr. Ambedkar Nagar Railway Station (MHOW)-Sanawad metre gauge train line. Two trains run on these route, one being the Heritage Train from Dr. Ambedkar Nagar Railway Station (MHOW) till Kalakund and the local train between Dr. Ambedkar Nagar Railway Station (MHOW) and Sanawad.

The heritage train offers views of the Ghats, the Valleys, the Choral River and the rail line itself which more than a century old. It returns back the same day to Dr. Ambedkar Nagar (MHOW) from Kalakund in the evening.

Road
To reach there via road, one has to first reach  Dr. Ambedkar Nagar (MHOW) town in Indore District. From where, the waterfall is situated at a distance of 8 KM on internal country roads.

Accidents

Deaths in 2011
During monsoon season (July-September), the area is prone to flash floods. On 17 July 2011, heavy rains occurred in the catchment area of the upstream. Over 50 visitors, many of them on a picnic, were sitting near the waterfall at that time. The local villagers warned them about the risk, and asked them to move away from water. Most of the visitors managed to get to safety, but five people were not able to move away in time. However, as they were crossing the stream, they were washed away in a sudden gush of water. Only two of them survived. The bodies of the victims were found over the next week: Chavi Dhoot of 22 years (18 July), Chandrashekhar Rathi of 55 years (19 July) and His daughter Mudita Rathi of 22 years (20 July). A video of the accident went viral. Subsequently, the local administration constructed a bridge and a staircase to avoid similar mishaps.

References 

Waterfalls of Madhya Pradesh
Tourist attractions in Indore district